This is a list of games released on the Atari VCS (2021 console). Games are purchased online directly from the console using the Atari VCS store. Atari VCS Vault which is a collection of one hundred Atari games is free on the system.

Games

Cloud Gaming Services 
The Atari VCS includes modern and retro cloud game gaming services. These apps can be downloaded from the Atari VCS store.

 Antstream Arcade
 Amazon Luna
 GeForce Now
 XBox Cloud Gaming

References 

Games on Atari platforms
Atari VCS (2021 console)